Vojtěch Kloz (born January 23, 1986) is a Czech professional ice hockey defenceman who plays for Hungarian club DEAC of the Erste Liga.

Career
Kloz began his career with his hometown HC Karlovy Vary in their junior setup. He also spent time with the United States Hockey League's Chicago Steel before he was drafted 50th overall by the Ontario Hockey League's Kingston Frontenacs in the 2003 CHL Import Draft. He played one season in the OHL before returning to Karlovy Vary, making his debut for the senior team during the 2005–06 Czech Extraliga season.

In 2010, Kloz moved to the Tipsport Liga in Slovakia with HK 36 Skalica. On April 30, 2012, Kloz made another return to Karlovy Vary. After one season he moved to the Polska Hokej Liga in Poland, signing for KH Sanok on August 28, 2013. On May 19, 2014, Kloz returned to Slovakia to sign with HK Nitra but left after playing just seven games and moved onto France's Ligue Magnus with Dauphins d'Épinal on October 8, 2014.

On August 25, 2017, Kloz signed with the Coventry Blaze of the United Kingdom's Elite Ice Hockey League A year later, he returned to France, signing for Chamonix HC of August 19, 2018. On June 7, 2019, Kloz joined fellow Ligue Magnus side Anglet Hormadi Élite.

In 2020, Kloz moved to Hungary to sign for Erste Liga side DEAC.

References

External links

1986 births
Living people
Anglet Hormadi Élite players
Chamonix HC players
Chicago Steel players
Coventry Blaze players
Czech ice hockey defencemen
Dauphins d'Épinal players
HC Karlovy Vary players
Kingston Frontenacs players
HK Nitra players
Piráti Chomutov players
KH Sanok players
HK 36 Skalica players
Sportovní Klub Kadaň players
Sportspeople from Karlovy Vary
Hokej Šumperk 2003 players
Czech expatriate ice hockey players in the United States
Czech expatriate ice hockey players in Canada
Czech expatriate ice hockey players in Slovakia
Czech expatriate sportspeople in England
Czech expatriate sportspeople in France
Czech expatriate sportspeople in Poland
Czech expatriate sportspeople in Hungary
Expatriate ice hockey players in France
Expatriate ice hockey players in England
Expatriate ice hockey players in Poland
Expatriate ice hockey players in Hungary
Debreceni EAC (ice hockey) players